Richard J. Maughan (November 13, 1917 – July 8, 1981) was an American judge who served as an Associate Justice of the Supreme Court of Utah from 1975 to 1981 and as Chief Justice of the Supreme Court of Utah in 1981.

Born in Cache Valley, Maughan received a JD from the University of Utah and was admitted to the bar in 1951. He was an Assistant State Attorney General in Utah from 1951 to 1969. In 1968 he was an unsuccessful candidate for the United States House of Representatives for Utah's 1st congressional district. Maughan ran as a Democrat, and was defeated in a landslide by Republican incumbent Laurence J. Burton, who received over 68% of the vote with 139,456 votes to Maughan's 65,265.

The following year, however, Maughan was appointed to the Utah State Board of Higher Education. In 1974, Maughan ran for a seat on the Utah Supreme Court, defeating incumbent E. R. Callister Jr.

References

External links
Mountain West Digital Library page on Richard J. Maughan

1917 births
1981 deaths
Justices of the Utah Supreme Court
Utah Democrats
Chief Justices of the Utah Supreme Court
20th-century American judges
S.J. Quinney College of Law alumni